The Chery eQ1 is an all-electric car that is manufactured by the NEV division of Chinese manufacturer Chery.

Overview
The eQ1 was originally planned to be called the Chery @ant during the reveal in 2016, but was later given the eQ1 name in line with the Chery eQ. The Chinese nickname was still the "Ant" during the official launch in 2017.

At the time of the launch, the price of the Chery eQ1 was from 49,800 yuan to 99,800 yuan (from $7,240 to $14,516), including subsidies for new energy vehicles in China.

The Chery eQ1 was available as part of the EvCard electric car-sharing service in China as of 2018.

The battery capacity has been upgraded since the launch. For the 2019 model year, the stated battery capacity is at least 30.6 kWh, with the latest version reportedly having a 38 kWh battery.

Typically for Chinese cars, the manufacturer provides only the range according to the NEDC cycle, which overestimates the range much more than the EPA cycle.

Charging takes 5–7 hours using a 6.6 kW charger, while fast charging from 30% to 80% takes 30–50 minutes.

Notes

References

External links

Production electric cars
eQ1
Cars introduced in 2017
Cars of China